The following is a list of universities and colleges in the Tibet (Xizang, 西藏) region of China. As of 2012, there are 5 institutions of higher learning in the province, out of which 3 offer Bachelor-degree studies.

Provincial universities
Tibet University (西藏大学, Lhasa and Nyingchi)

Provincial colleges with bachelor-degree studies
Tibet Minzu University (西藏民族学院, located in Xianyang, Shaanxi but under supervision of the Tibetan provincial government)
Tibet University of Traditional Tibetan Medicine (西藏藏医学院, Lhasa)

Provincial colleges with sub-degree studies
Tibet Vocational Technical College (西藏职业技术学院, Lhasa)
Tibet Police Officers Institute (西藏警官高等专科学校, Lhasa)

References

External links
List of Chinese Higher Education Institutions — Ministry of Education
List of Chinese universities, including official links
Tibet Institutions Admitting International Students

 
Universities
Tibet

Universities